"Renegade" is a song by HammerFall, the first single from their album Renegade. It was released on 21 August 2000 and contains three audio tracks (two of those are non-album tracks), screensavers and a video special. It includes a cover version of the 1983 Accept song "Head over Heels" (from their album Balls to the Wall).

It reached 89th in the German charts and scored 17th in Sweden.

Track listing

Bonus materials
'Behind the scenes' footage from the recording session.
 HammerFall screensaver.

Personnel
Joacim Cans – Lead and backing vocals
Oscar Dronjak – Guitar and backing vocals
Stefan Elmgren – Lead guitar
Magnus Rosén – Bass guitar
Anders Johansson – Drums

Additional personnel
Track 1: vocals, guitar and keyboards by Kai Hansen, backing vocals by Udo Dirkschneider.
Track 2: backing vocals by the Wahlqvist Brothers.
Track 3: lead vocals by Udo Dirkschneider, backing vocals by Kai Hansen.

Release information
 Limited 7" Red Vinyl release with two tracks: "Renegade" on A-side and "Head Over Heels" on B-side. "Head Over Heels" is taken from the Nuclear Blast compilation "A Tribute to Accept". 
 Limited 7" Test Pressing black Vinyl release with the first two tracks on it. Only a handful were made.

References

External links
 Official HammerFall website
 Album information

2000 songs
HammerFall songs
Songs written by Joacim Cans
Songs written by Oscar Dronjak
Nuclear Blast Records singles
2000 singles
Songs written by Jesper Strömblad